SF Airlines is a Chinese cargo airline owned by SF Express (Group) Co. The company is headquartered in the No.1 Freight Depot of the International Shipping Center of Shenzhen Bao'an International Airport in Bao'an District, Shenzhen, Guangdong province.

History
Although a preparatory team for SF Airlines was founded in 2005, it wasn't until 2009 that the preparation was approved by the Civil Aviation Administration of China. A successful maiden flight was made on 31 December 2009.

SF Airlines began its first flights, in 2010, to the plateau area of Yushu City, Qinghai carrying earthquake relief materials. Shortly after, a second Boeing 757-200F was put into operation.

In 2011, SF Airlines became the first company in the industry to pass the CCAR-121-R4 for supplemental operations. They also flew their first Boeing 737-300F in 2011. SF Airlines passed the International Region Supplemental Operation Assessment and became qualified to operate international routes.

In 2012, SF Airlines operated its first Boeing 737-400F.

In October 2014 Boeing announced that an undisclosed number of Boeing 767-300ER will be converted by Boeing to a Freighter as part of the proven BCF Program for Fleet Expansion by SF Airlines with an entry into service in 2015 of the first aircraft. This agreement also included a Letter of Intent to acquire Boeing 737 Next Generation 800 based Boeing Converted Freighters for future fleet expansion and to replace existing B737 Classic aircraft.

SF Airlines had a fleet of 26 Boeing aircraft by the end of 2015. The company managed to establish a hub in Hangzhou Xiaoshan International Airport to help expand its business in East China.

On 21 October 2016, SF Airlines' 36th freighter and also the 4th B767-300BCF took its test flight in Singapore then diverted to Shenzhen Bao'an International Airport and SF Airlines was arguably the No.1 cargo carrier in China in terms of fleet numbers.

In November 2017,  SF airlines bought 2 Boeing 747-400ERF of defunct Jade Cargo International, in an auction held by Alibaba worth 320 million CNY (US$48.4 million).

Fleet
, SF Airlines fleet consists of the following aircraft:

Gallery

References

External links

 SF Airlines

SF Express
Cargo airlines of China
Companies based in Shenzhen
Airlines established in 2009
Chinese companies established in 2009